The 1965 Asia Badminton Championships was the 2nd tournament of the Badminton Asia Championships. It was held in Lucknow, India.

Final results

Medalists

References

Badminton Asia Championships
1965 in badminton
International sports competitions hosted by India
Badminton tournaments in India